Sagina procumbens is a species of flowering plant.
in the family Caryophyllaceae known by the common names procumbent pearlwort, birdeye pearlwort and matted pearlwort. It can be found throughout the Northern Hemisphere and parts of South America. It is a common weed of many environments. It can be found in wild and disturbed habitat, especially moist areas. It can sometimes be seen growing in lawns or in cracks in pavements. This is a perennial herb forming clumps or mats of hairless green herbage, sometimes vaguely resembling a patch of moss. The leaves are linear and up to 1 or 2 centimeters long. The inflorescence is a solitary flower with four or five sepals and four or five small white petals, but the petals are sometimes absent.

Description
Showing short leaves no more than 10mm long. Flowers minute and solitary, sepals 4 or 5, petals minute or absent.

As an invasive species
In 1998 numerous well-developed plants were found on the UNESCO World Heritage Site of Gough Island, where it is an introduced species. Given the island's remoteness, seeds were most likely introduced from visitors' footwear and/or clothing. Without control the plant will very likely transform the ecosystem of the island's uplands, as it has already done on the Prince Edward Islands, where it has spread at a rate of 100m to 300m per year and is now considered beyond control. Eradication programs on Gough Island are ongoing and are expected to require years of 'concerted effort'.

Role in myths, magic and legends of Great Britain
It is said to have been the first plant on which Christ set his foot when he came to Earth, or when he rose from the dead. In the highlands of Scotland it was supposed to have derived supernatural powers from having been blessed by Christ, St Bride and St Columba. A spray of it hung from the door lintel gave protection against fairies, especially those who made a practise of spiriting people away. If pearlwort were stuck in a bull's fore-hooves, the cows with which it mated and the calves and the milk they produced were safeguarded from ills. If a cow ate the herb, its calves and milk, and all who drank the milk, were also protected against fairies. For the young village maiden, pearlwort brought a bonus. If drunk in an infusion, or used merely to wet the lips, it would attract her favoured  lover, and if a piece  of it were in the girl's  mouth when she kissed him, he was bound to her for ever.

Etymology
Sagina means 'fodder'; the genus was named for a fodder plant, spurrey, which has since been moved into its own genus, Spergula.

Procumbens means 'procumbent', 'lying flat on the ground', or 'creeping forwards'.

References

External links

Jepson Manual Treatment
USDA Plants Profile
Flora of North America
Washington Burke Museum
Illinois Wildflowers
Photo gallery

procumbens
Flora of Asia
Flora of Europe
Flora of North America
Plants described in 1753
Taxa named by Carl Linnaeus
Invasive plant species of subantarctic islands